Brittain Brown (born October 10, 1997) is an American football running back for the Las Vegas Raiders of the National Football League (NFL). He played college football for the Duke Blue Devils and UCLA Bruins. During the 2021 season, he and Zach Charbonnet shared the Bruins' rushing duties in a two-back system.

Professional career
Brown was drafted by the Las Vegas Raiders in the seventh round, 250th overall, of the 2022 NFL Draft.

References

External links
 Las Vegas Raiders bio
 UCLA Bruins bio
 Duke Blue Devils bio

Living people
1997 births
American football running backs
Duke Blue Devils football players
UCLA Bruins football players
Las Vegas Raiders players
People from Canton, Georgia
Players of American football from Georgia (U.S. state)